Vrtekica is a village in the municipality of Studeničani, North Macedonia.

Demographics
According to the 1467-68 Ottoman defter, Vrtekica appears as being inhabited by an Orthodox Albanian population. Some families had a mixed Slav-Albanian anthroponomy - usually a Slavic first name and an Albanian last name or last names with Albanian patronyms and Slavic suffixes. 

The names are: Jorgo son of Progon, Leka Kovac (treasurer), Preno son of Stala, Kolojan son of Ton-ço, Tonço son of Kalojan.  

According to the 2021 census, the village had a total of 90 inhabitants. Ethnic groups in the village include:

Albanians 90

References

Villages in Studeničani Municipality
Albanian communities in North Macedonia